Coffee production in Guatemala began to develop in the 1850s. Coffee is an important element of Guatemala's economy.

Guatemala was Central America's top producer of coffee for most of the 20th and the beginning of the 21st century, until being overtaken by Honduras in 2011. Illegal exports to Honduras and Mexico are not reflected in official statistics.

Geography

History

The coffee industry began to develop in Guatemala in the 1850s and 1860s, initially mixing its cultivation with cochineal. German immigrants played “a very important role” in the introduction of coffee to the country, according to Marta Elena Casaús Arzú. Small plantations flourished in Amatitlán and Antigua areas in the southwest. Initial growth though was slow due to lack of knowledge and technology. Many planters had to rely on loans and borrow from their families to finance their coffee estates (fincas) with coffee production in Guatemala increasingly owned by foreign companies who possessed the financial power to buy plantations and provide investment.

A scarcity of laborers was the main obstacle to a rapid increase of coffee production in Guatemala. From 1879 to 1883, Guatemala exported  pounds of coffee. By 1902 the most important coffee plantations were found on the southern coast.

Many acres of land were suitable for this cultivation, and the varieties that were produced in the temperate regions were superior. Coffee was grown around Guatemala City, Chimaltenango, and Verapaz. The majority of the plantations were located in the departments of Guatemala, Amatitlan, Sacatepequez, Solola, Retalhuleu, Quezaltenango, San Marcos, and Alta Verapaz.

Anacafé

Anacafé (Asociación Nacional del Café) was established in 1960 as a national coffee association, representing all coffee producers in Guatemala. It was initiated by the precursors to the International Coffee Organization, as a way of centralizing statistics of the nation's coffee production as it continued the work of La Oficina Central del Café, previously established and operated by the central government which in turn was established in 1928.

Anacafé has established a Guatemalan Coffees brand, and defined eight coffee regions under the slogan "A Rainbow of Choices". The regions are: Acatenango Valley, Antigua Coffee, Traditional Atitlan, Rainforest Coban, Fraijanes Plateau, Highland Huehue, New Oriente, and Volcanic San Marcos. 

Anacafé has built the Analab coffee laboratories, established a funcafé program for children, and publishes El Cafetal, a coffee magazine.  Anacafé represents Guatemala in the International Coffee Organization's meetings, and receives income only from service charges on exported coffee items.

Labor issues
Research has shown that some of Guatemala's coffee producers used child labor in 2013, according to the U.S. Department of Labor.

References

External links

 

Economy of Guatemala
Agriculture in Guatemala
Guatemala